Napalai Tansai (born 20 May 1982 in Chonburi) is a Thai windsurfer. She has competed at three Olympics, at the 2000, 2008 and 2012 Summer Olympics.  In 2000, sailing in the Mistral One class, she finished in 19th place.  The Mistral class was replaced with the RS:X class in which she finished in 20th place in 2008 and 24th place in 2012.

References

External links 
 
 
 

1982 births
Living people
Napalai Tansai
Female windsurfers
Napalai Tansai
Napalai Tansai
Sailors at the 2000 Summer Olympics – Mistral One Design
Sailors at the 2008 Summer Olympics – RS:X
Sailors at the 2012 Summer Olympics – RS:X
Napalai Tansai
Asian Games medalists in sailing
Sailors at the 2002 Asian Games
Sailors at the 2006 Asian Games
Sailors at the 2010 Asian Games
Medalists at the 2006 Asian Games
Medalists at the 2010 Asian Games
Napalai Tansai
Southeast Asian Games medalists in sailing
Competitors at the 2011 Southeast Asian Games
Napalai Tansai
Napalai Tansai